

A11A Multivitamins, combinations

A11AA Multivitamins with minerals
A11AA01 Multivitamins and iron
A11AA02 Multivitamins and calcium
A11AA03 Multivitamins and other minerals, including combinations
A11AA04 Multivitamins and trace elements

A11AB Multivitamins, other combinations

A11B Multivitamins, plain

A11BA Multivitamins, plain

A11C Vitamin A and D, including combinations of the two

A11CA Vitamin A, plain
A11CA01 Retinol (vitamin A)
A11CA02 Betacarotene

A11CB Vitamin A and D in combination

A11CC Vitamin D and analogues
A11CC01 Ergocalciferol
A11CC02 Dihydrotachysterol
A11CC03 Alfacalcidol
A11CC04 Calcitriol
A11CC05 Colecalciferol
A11CC06 Calcifediol
A11CC20 Combinations
A11CC55 Colecalciferol, combinations

A11D Vitamin B1, plain and in combination with vitamin B6 and B12

A11DA Vitamin B1, plain
A11DA01 Thiamine (vitamin B1)
A11DA02 Sulbutiamine
A11DA03 Benfotiamine

A11DB Vitamin B1 in combination with vitamin B6 and/or vitamin B12

A11E Vitamin B-complex, including combinations

A11EA Vitamin B-complex, plain

A11EB Vitamin B-complex with vitamin C

A11EC Vitamin B-complex with minerals

A11ED Vitamin B-complex with anabolic steroids

A11EX Vitamin B-complex, other combinations

A11G Ascorbic acid (vitamin C), including combinations

A11GA Ascorbic acid (vitamin C), plain
A11GA01 Ascorbic acid (vitamin C)

A11GB Ascorbic acid (vitamin C), combinations
A11GB01 Ascorbic acid (vitamin C) and calcium

A11H Other plain vitamin preparations

A11HA Other plain vitamin preparations
A11HA01 Nicotinamide
A11HA02 Pyridoxine (vitamin B6)
A11HA03 Tocopherol (vitamin E)
A11HA04 Riboflavin (vitamin B2)
A11HA05 Biotin
A11HA06 Pyridoxal phosphate
A11HA07 Inositol
A11HA08 Tocofersolan
A11HA30 Dexpanthenol
A11HA31 Calcium pantothenate
A11HA32 Pantethine

A11J Other vitamin products, combinations

A11JA Combinations of vitamins

A11JB Vitamins with minerals

A11JC Vitamins, other combinations

References

A11